Heath Spencer Irwin (born June 27, 1973) is a former American football guard in the National Football League (NFL). He played for the New England Patriots, the Miami Dolphins, and the St. Louis Rams. He played college football for the Colorado Buffaloes after graduating from Boulder High School.

He was both a high school football and college football All-American and a star offensive lineman on a record-setting Colorado offensive unit. In the NFL, his team made the playoffs in five of his first six seasons.  He is both the son of a former Colorado football player and the nephew of Hale Irwin, also a former football player at Colorado, who would eventually go on to win three U.S. Open golf titles and become a World Golf Hall of Fame member.

Early life and college
Irwin was a high school All-American (by Super Prep and Tom Lemming's Prep Football Report) at Boulder High School, where he played offensive guard and defensive tackle. He also competed in the shot put and discus throw in high school.  He was a 1995 College Football All-America Team first-team selection by the Associated Press for the 1995 Colorado Buffaloes football team and an honorable mention selection by the United Press International as a senior as well as a second-team All-American on the 1994 Colorado Buffaloes football team that had a record-setting 5,448 total net yards of offense including the famed Miracle at Michigan.

Professional career
Irwin was drafted 101st overall with the sixth pick in the fourth round of the 1996 NFL Draft by the New England Patriots. He played 87 NFL regular season games, starting 29.  He was a member of the Patriots from 1996 to 1999, the Dolphins in 2000 and 2001 and the 2002 St. Louis Rams. He also played in a total of 6 National Football League playoff games, starting 1, while being inactive for an additional three (including Super Bowl XXXI).  He was signed to play for the 2003 Denver Broncos, but he was waived at the end of training camp. His team went to the playoffs in five of his first six seasons, and the only losing team he played for was the 7–9 2002 Rams.

Personal
His father Phil Irwin played football for Colorado from 1968 to 1970. He started at linebacker on the 1968 through 1970 teams. He had 4 interceptions for the 1969 Colorado Buffaloes football team. His uncle Hale Irwin played a variety of positions at Colorado ranging from  quarterback to defensive back and punt returner on the 1964 through 1966 Colorado teams. He had 100 career rushing yards, 24 pass attempts and 9 interceptions (on defense). Hale Irwin has been described as an average quarterback who became an outstanding defensive back and earned first-team All-Big 8 Conference recognition in both 1965 and 1966 as a safety before becoming a Hall of Fame golfer. Heath's wife is named Molly, and they have both a daughter (Bailee) and a son (Houston).

Notes

1973 births
Living people
Sportspeople from Boulder, Colorado
Players of American football from Colorado
American football offensive guards
Colorado Buffaloes football players
Miami Dolphins players
New England Patriots players
St. Louis Rams players